= Costas Petsas =

Cypriot footballer (born 1961)

Personal information
- Date of birth: 11 April 1961 (age 65)
- Position: Defender

Senior career*
| Years | Team | Apps | (Gls) |
| 1979–1994 | AC Omonia | | |

International career
| 1988–1989 | Cyprus | 8 | (0) |
- * Club domestic league appearances and goals

Costas Petsas (born 11 April 1961) is a retired Cypriot football defender.
